The Speaker of the Knesset is the presiding officer of the Knesset, the unicameral legislature of Israel. The Speaker also acts as President of Israel when the President is incapacitated. The current speaker is Amir Ohana, who was elected on 29 December 2022.

To date, Ahdut HaAvoda's Nahum Nir and Blue & White's Benny Gantz are the only Speakers not to have come from the ruling party, though in two cases (Avraham Burg and Reuven Rivlin) the party of the speaker (One Israel and Likud respectively) lost power during their term.

The speaker is expected to act in a non-partisan nature, but may occasionally take part in debates, and is allowed to vote.

The speaker is assisted by a number of Deputy Speakers of the Knesset (currently 5). The Deputy Speakers are drawn from the breadth of parties represented in the Knesset. Together, the Speaker and the Deputy Speakers constitute the Praesidium of the Knesset.

Knesset Speakers (1949–present)
A total of twenty people have served as Speaker of the Knesset, two of whom, Reuven Rivlin and Yariv Levin, have served two non-consecutive terms.

References

External links

Speaker of the Knesset and the list of all Knesset Speakers since the first Knesset Knesset website
Israeli ministries, etc – Rulers.org

Israel
Speakers
 

de:Knesset#Parlamentspräsident